{{listen
 | filename    = Tomas_Luis_de_Victoria_O_vos_omnes_(The_Tudor_Consort).ogg
 | title       = O vos omnes (Victoria: 1585)
 | description = Recorded live in 2003 by The Tudor Consort (1.8Mb)
 | format      = Ogg
}}O vos omnes'' is a responsory, originally sung as part of Roman Catholic liturgies for Holy Week, and now often sung as a motet.  The text is adapted from the Latin Vulgate translation of Lamentations 1:12.  It was often set, especially in the sixteenth century, as part of the Tenebrae Responsories for Holy Saturday.  Some of the most famous settings of the text are by:
 Tomás Luis de Victoria (two settings for four voices: 1572 and 1585)
 Carlo Gesualdo (five voices: 1603; six voices: 1611)
 Pablo Casals (mixed choir: 1932)

Text
O vos ómnes qui transítis per víam, atténdite et vidéte:
 Si est dólor símilis sícut dólor méus.
V. Atténdite, univérsi pópuli, et vidéte dolórem méum.
 Si est dólor símilis sícut dólor méus.

Translation
O all you who walk by on the road, pay attention and see:
 if there be any sorrow like my sorrow.
V. Pay attention, all people, and look at my sorrow:
 if there be any sorrow like my sorrow.

See also
 Juan Esquivel Barahona

References 
 O vos omnes

Motets
Tenebrae